Adam Hostetter (born December 22, 1974) is an American snowboarder. He competed in the men's giant slalom event at the 1998 Winter Olympics.

References

External links
 

1974 births
Living people
American male snowboarders
Olympic snowboarders of the United States
Snowboarders at the 1998 Winter Olympics
Sportspeople from Barnstable County, Massachusetts
20th-century American people
21st-century American people